Demetrida angulata is a species of ground beetle in subfamily Lebiinae. It was described by William John Macleay in 1864 and is found in Australia.

References

Beetles described in 1864
Beetles of Australia
angusticollis